Russell Lowell Maughan (March 28, 1893 – April 21, 1958) was an officer in the United States Army and a pioneer aviator. His career began during World War I, and spanned the period in which military aviation developed from a minor arm of the Army Signal Corps to the huge Army Air Forces on the verge of becoming a separate service.

Maughan became a pursuit pilot and served in combat in France in 1918 with the United States Army Air Service. Following the war, he remained in the Air Service and became a test pilot. In 1924 Maughan completed the first flight across the continental United States within the hours of daylight of a single calendar day.

Biography
Maughan was born March 28, 1893 in Logan, Utah, to Peter W. and Mary (née Naef) Maughan. He graduated from Utah State Agricultural College in June 1917.

The United States had entered World War I and Maughan enlisted as an Army aviation cadet. Commissioned a first lieutenant in the Signal Officer Reserve Corps after flight training and rated a Reserve Military Aviator, he served in France with the 139th Aero Squadron, where he flew a Spad XIII. Maughan was credited with four aerial victories and awarded the Distinguished Service Cross on October 27, 1918, the citation for which is given below.

He remained in the Air Service following the end of the war and was assigned to its Engineering Division at McCook Field, Dayton, Ohio, as a test pilot. Besides testing new designs, his responsibilities including public demonstrations of military aircraft and participation in air races. The Engineering Division had drawn the interest of Brig. Gen. Billy Mitchell, Assistant Chief of the Air Service, who saw in it the opportunity for promoting the concept of an Air Force independent of the Army. On July 1, 1920, when the Air Service became a combat arm of the Army, Maughan received a Regular commission as a 1st lieutenant, Air Service. He transferred to Crissy Field at the Presidio of San Francisco in 1921 and joined the 91st Observation Squadron, then engaged in aerial forest fire patrol.

On October 16, flying the 1-kilometer course, he averaged  for eight circuits,  for four, and reached  on one. This established a new international record, but it was not observed by Fédération Aéronautique Internationale (FAI) officials and was not officially recognized.

He also made two attempts in July to fly coast-to-coast in a single day, using the new Curtiss PW-8, but mechanical problems thwarted both flights. On June 23, 1924, his third attempt succeeded, the first Dawn-to-dusk transcontinental flight across the United States. The flight was made in six legs, with an actual flying time of 18 hours and 20 minutes, at an average ground speed of more than 156 mph. In 1928 he was awarded the Distinguished Flying Cross for the flight.

Maughan served in the Philippines from 1930 to 1935, with duty as Secretary of Aviation and Consultant to the Philippine Cabinet from 1930 to 1932. In 1939 he surveyed and selected airfields in Greenland and Iceland for aircraft ferry routes to Britain.

Maughan, promoted to lieutenant colonel, commanded the 60th Transport Group, Pope Field, North Carolina, from July 28, 1941 to April 15, 1942. Promoted again to colonel, he was advanced to command of the 51st Troop Carrier Wing from June 1, 1942 to October 20, 1942, which included its deployment to England.

Colonel Maughan retired in 1946, and died April 21, 1958, at San Antonio, Texas during surgery. He is buried in the Logan City Cemetery near the Utah State University campus in Logan, Utah. He is a member of the Utah Aviation Hall of Fame and is honored with a plaque in the Hill Aerospace Museum, Hill Air Force Base, Utah. A plaque commemorating the first "Dawn-to-dusk transcontinental flight across the United States was erected on the Utah State University campus in Logan, Utah, on Veteran's Day, 2006.

Awards
Distinguished Service Cross
Distinguished Flying Cross
World War I Victory Medal
American Defense Service Medal
American Campaign Medal
European-African-Middle Eastern Campaign Medal
World War II Victory Medal

Citation for Distinguished Service Cross
MAUGHAN, RUSSELL L.
First Lieutenant (Air Service), U.S. Army
Pilot, 139th Aero Squadron, Air Service, A.E.F.
Date of Action: October 27, 1918
Citation:
The Distinguished Service Cross is presented to Russell L. Maughan, First Lieutenant (Air Service), U.S. Army, for extraordinary heroism in action near Sommerance, France, October 27, 1918. Accompanied by two other planes, Lieutenant Maughan was patrolling our lines, when he saw slightly below him an enemy plane (Fokker type). When he started an attack upon it he was attacked from behind by four more of the enemy. By several well-directed shots he sent one of his opponents to the earth, and, although the forces of the enemy were again increased by seven planes, he so skillfully maneuvered that he was able to escape toward his lines. While returning he attacked and brought down an enemy plane which was diving on our trenches.
General Orders No. 46, W.D., 1919
Birth: Logan, UT
Home Town: Logan, UT

Citation for Distinguished Flying Cross
Rank: First Lieutenant
 
General Orders:  War Department, General Orders No. 4 (1928)
 
Citation:
The President of the United States of America, authorized by Act of Congress, July 2, 1926, takes pleasure in presenting the Distinguished Flying Cross to First Lieutenant (Air Service) Russell L. Maughan, U.S. Army Air Corps, for extraordinary achievement while participating in an aerial flight. Lieutenant Maughan departed from Mitchel Field, Long Island, New York, at 2:58 a.m. Eastern standard time, on 23 June 1924, in a modified service type pursuit airplane on the dawn-to-dusk flight, and landed at Crissy Field, San Francisco, California, at 9:47 p.m. Pacific time, the same date. He flew over 2,540 miles in 21 hours and 48 and a half minutes, thereby making the fastest time ever made by man between New York and San Francisco.

References

. Chapter 3.
. Originally published by USAF Historical Division.
Hill AFB biography article
General Aviation News articles--some inaccuracies

External links
Hill Aerospace Museum - Utah Aviation Hall of Fame - Colonel Russell Lowell Maughan USAF (United States Army Air Force)
History To Go

1893 births
1958 deaths
United States Army Air Service pilots of World War I
Aviators from Utah
Recipients of the Distinguished Service Cross (United States)
United States Army Air Forces personnel of World War II
United States Army Air Forces officers
Utah State University alumni
Air Corps Tactical School alumni